Square Two is the second single album by South Korean girl group Blackpink. It was released as a digital single on November 1, 2016, by YG Entertainment and distributed by KT Music. The single has a double A-side, "Playing with Fire" and "Stay" as well as an acoustic version of "Whistle". The lyrics were written by Teddy Park and the music was composed by Teddy Park, R.Tee and Seo Won-jin.

Promotion 
On October 19, 2016, it was revealed that Blackpink would be the next YG Entertainment artist to make a comeback. On October 24, the teaser images of members Lisa and Jennie were revealed, with the name of one of the main titles, "Playing With Fire", followed by the teaser images of Rosé and Jisoo the following day. The teaser photos of the entire group were revealed on October 27 for the second main track "Stay". On October 30, YG Entertainment posted a backstage video for "Stay" and the next day for "Playing With Fire".

The group performed their two new titles live for the first time at SBS' Inkigayo on November 6.

Music videos 
The music videos of "Playing with Fire" was directed by Seo Hyun-seung and "Stay" was directed by Han Sa-min, who had previously directed the music videos of "Gotta Be You" by 2NE1 and "Sober" by Big Bang. They were posted on Blackpink's official YouTube channel on November 1, 2016.

Blackpink also posted the music video clip for the choreography of "Playing With Fire" on its official YouTube channel on November 4, 2016. The choreography was created by Kyle Hanagami, who has already worked with the group for the song "Boombayah" from their previous single album Square One.

Commercial performance 
In the United States, Square Two debuted on the Billboard Top Heatseekers chart at number 13 and on the Billboard World Albums chart at number 3 for the chart issue dated November 19, 2016. The following week, the album rose to a peak of number 2 on the World Albums chart for the chart issue dated November 26, 2016. The album stayed on the World Albums chart for a total of 22 non-consecutive weeks. As of August 2017, Square Two moved 7,000 copies and the five singles included on the digital EP sold a total of 113,000 digital song downloads in the U.S.

Track listing

Charts

References 

Blackpink albums
Korean-language albums
YG Entertainment albums
Genie Music albums
2016 albums
Single albums